Joseba Agirre Oliden (born 24 March 1977) is a Spanish former footballer who played as a midfielder.

Club career
Born in Orio, Gipuzkoa, Agirre was a product of local Real Sociedad's youth system, and made his senior debut with the reserves in the 1995–96 season, in Segunda División B. On 25 May 1996 he appeared in his first and only game with the first team, playing the last 17 minutes of a 3–2 La Liga away win over Racing de Santander.

In summer 1998, Agirre joined CD Castellón also in the third division. Four years later he signed for fellow league club CE L'Hospitalet. After appearing with the Catalans in the 2002–03 regular season he competed with Ciudad de Murcia in the play-offs, helping to a first-ever promotion to Segunda División.

Agirre moved to CD Toledo, still in division three, for the 2003–04 campaign. Subsequently, he joined Real Unión also in the third tier, being first choice in his first four seasons and still contributing 16 matches in the fifth as the Basques returned to the second division after 44 years. He made only one competitive appearance in 2009–10, however, a 2–1 loss at RC Celta de Vigo in the Copa del Rey, and also saw his team be immediately relegated back.

In January 2010, Agirre joined CD Laudio from Tercera División. In July 2012 he renewed his contract with the club, and was also promoted to division three in 2013, appearing in 36 matches in the process.

References

External links

1977 births
Living people
People from Urola Kosta
Spanish footballers
Footballers from the Basque Country (autonomous community)
Association football midfielders
La Liga players
Segunda División B players
Tercera División players
Real Sociedad B footballers
Real Sociedad footballers
CD Castellón footballers
CE L'Hospitalet players
Ciudad de Murcia footballers
CD Toledo players
Real Unión footballers
CD Laudio players